The 2011 OFC Beach Soccer Championship took place from February 23 to February 26, 2011, in Papeete, Tahiti, It acted as a qualifier for the 2011 FIFA Beach Soccer World Cup. This was the third time the island had hosted the competition, following the 2006 and 2009 tournaments in Moorea. Only the winners of the tournament, Tahiti, qualified to play in the 2011 FIFA Beach Soccer World Cup. The Solomon Islands were the favorites, having won the last 3 other qualifying championships in 2006, 2007 and 2009, but surprisingly lost in the final to Tahiti, despite beating them in the group stage. This means for the first time since 2005, the Solomon Islands will not be representing Oceania at the world cup.

All matches were held at the new Jardin de Paofai complex in Papeete, which was opened on February 15, 2011.

Participating teams
Four teams decided to enter into the tournament to compete for the one spot in the 2011 FIFA Beach Soccer World Cup. These were the same nations who competed in the 2009 OFC Beach Soccer Championship.

Unfortunately, due to a cyclone recently passing through the region, the Vanuatu national team was stranded at their airport as they were about to leave for Tahiti to attend the tournament. As a result, they were forced to withdraw from the tournament.

Participating:

Withdrawing:

Group stage 
The group stage was going to begin on February 22, but due to the cyclone which forced Vanuatu to withdraw, it commenced on February 23 with no rest day and consisted of each nation playing each other once in a single round-robin format.

All kickoff times are listed as Tahitian local time, (UTC-10).

Tournament final

Winners

Awards

Team qualifying

Top scorers

4 goals
 James Naka
 Jo Dugucagi
 Robert Laua
3 goals
 Franco Ne'e
 Teiva Izal
 Nicholas Muri
2 goals
 McPhillip Aisa
 Naea Bennett
 Patrick Tepa

2 goals (cont.)
 Rajnesh Ratu (Ratan)
1 goal
 Teva Zaveroni
 Archie Watkins
 Tainui Lehartel
 Maciu Dunadamu
 Sandeep Nair
 Marama Amau
Own Goal
 Maciu Dunadamu (for  Tahiti)

Final standings

References

External links
2011 OFC Beach Soccer Championship

Beach Soccer Championship
Beach Soccer Championship
Qualification Ofc
International association football competitions hosted by French Polynesia
2011
2011 in beach soccer